is a comedy fantasy science fiction anime produced by AIC in 1999 and is licensed in the United States by Viz Media. The series features Cacao, a student at Micro-Grand Academy studying magic. One day, while his magic class teacher, Ghana, is performing a spell to summon a tree spirit, Cacao finds and eats some chocolate, which turns out to be 200-year-old magical chocolate. After eating the chocolate he becomes drunk and causes a wreck. During this, he interferes with Ghana's spell, letting the spirit, Hinano, escape. She inhabits the body of a marionette, who then moves in with Cacao.

Subsequent episodes of Trouble Chocolate have little connected storyline. Rather, the show is a parody of other anime. For example, two other characters, Murakata and Deborah, are constantly shown professing their love to each other, set to absurdly explosive special effects and backdrops, as is common (to a lesser extent) in many anime.

The dubbed dialogue in Trouble Chocolate (written by professional comedy writer Pamela Ribon and recorded by The Ocean Group) often bears little or no resemblance to the original script (as heard in Japanese and seen in the subtitles), as opposed to the normal convention of translating the words as directly as the change in lip-sync will allow.

Plot
Cacao woke up to find a girl sleeping in his bed. Unable to remember what has happened on his own and did not get enough needed answers from Hinano, he went back to school and ask his friends about what really happened. He finally got the explanation of events from Professor Ghana for exchange in joining his wizardry class.

Characters

The main male character of the series. He often gets drunk by eating chocolate. Cacao is rather lazy and always hungry.

The main female character of the series. She is a fairy spirit who inhabits the marionette. She will do anything to protect Cacao and make him happy.

The handsome star athlete and Mister Popular all around. He is adored by his girlfriend Deborah and is often seen together. He is also captain of the school security force, SMAT and has an alter-ego known as the Masked Driver.

Hinano's rival and lover of Murakata. She is pretty, popular, and sometimes jealous of Hinano for receiving attention from the male students. Deborah is also second in command of SMAT. 

A super-rich heir of the city's chocolate conglomerate. He is madly in love with Hinano and will go great lengths to win her affection. 

A tribal boy who was accidentally transported to the city when Cacao interfered with a magic spell. Almond once ate enough food to feed 100,000 people in a matter of hours. He resembles a tornado similar to the Tasmanian Devil when he hunts for food.

 / Ganache

A wizard teacher at MG Academy. He constantly attempts to teach Cacao magic, with little or no success. 

A Frankenstein teacher at MG Academy. He is shown to have feelings for Papaya. He dislikes spiders, frogs, and anyone who upsets him.    

A vampire teacher at MG Academy. He hates sunlight, but loves to sleep in his coffin.

 / Green Tea

A Chinese mercenary who hunts chocolate monster cards. Her younger twin sister is Azuki. Both of them are terrible comedians. 

 / Red Bean

A Chinese mercenary who hunts chocolate monster cards. Her older twin sister is Matcha. Together, they are terrible comedians. 

 / Ham Ham

The alien shop owner of Dagashi-ya and Cacao's landlord.

An elementary school newspaper reporter and a member of SMAT. She writes down about everyone or everything in her notepad. 

A small nerdish male member of SMAT and Cacao's best friend. He always carry his laptop around at school.  

A girl who has desires to take over the world. However, she is mostly a joke when it comes to evil.                                                                                                             

Crunchy Bug (Spider Monster) 

A friendly, humanoid bug who works for Mint as a sidekick. He befriended Hinano and develops a crush on her. 

Truffle's grandfather and Ganache's arch-nemesis. He is the main antagonist of the series.

Theme Songs
Openings
"C.H.O.C.O."
Lyricist: Akio Togashi / Composer: Akio Togashi / Arranger: Akio Togashi / Singers: Sakura Tange&Kyoko Hikami

Endings

October 8, 1999 - January 14, 2000, March 24, 2000
Lyricist: Atsushi Iwamizu / Composer: Hitoshi Harukawa, Shifo / Arranger: Hitoshi Harukawa / Singers: Rie Yoshizawa
Episodes: 1-12, 20

January 21, 2000 - March 17, 2000
Lyricist: Seiko Matsuda / Composer: Seiko Matsuda, Ryo Ogura / Arranger: Ando Takahiro / Singers: Sakura Tange&Kyoko Hikami
Episodes: 13-19

Episode list

Reception
THEM Anime Reviews gave Trouble Chocolate two stars, saying that it's "At best, worth a rental, but only if you've seen everything else at Blockbuster".

Mania.com gave the first North American Trouble Chocolate DVD a B+ for audio, a B for video, a B+ for packaging, a C for its menu and a B for its extras.

digitallyOBSESSED! gave the first North American Trouble Chocolate DVD a B for style, a B− for substance, a B+ for image transfer, a B+ for audio transfer and a D for extras.

References

External links

 
Trouble Chocolate at Allcinema 
Trouble Chocolate at IMDb

1999 anime television series debuts
1999 Japanese television series debuts
2000 Japanese television series endings
Anime International Company
Avex Group
TV Asahi original programming
Comedy anime and manga
Fantasy anime and manga
Science fiction anime and manga
Viz Media anime
Anime with original screenplays
Seinen manga